Ignacio Ramírez may refer to:

 Ignacio Ramírez (politician) (1818-1879), Mexican politician and writer
 Ignacio Ramírez de Haro, 15th Count of Bornos (1918-2010), Spanish nobleman
 Ignacio Ramírez (volleyball) (born 1976), Mexican volleyball player
 Ignacio Ramírez (footballer) (born 1997), Uruguayan footballer